Tell Me You Love Me may refer to:
Tell Me You Love Me (TV series), 2007 HBO television drama series
Tell Me You Love Me (album), 2017 album by Demi Lovato
"Tell Me You Love Me" (song), 2017 song by Demi Lovato
"Tell Me You Love Me", single from Frank Zappa album Chunga's Revenge
"Tell Me You Love Me", song from Leela James album My Soul
"Tell Me U Luv Me", 2020 song by Juice Wrld and Trippe Redd